KDB Seteria (P-04) is the third ship of Waspada-class built up in the late 1970s, one of three ordered in Singapore. She was launched on 1978, and is still in active service with the Royal Brunei Navy.

Construction 
Seteria was ordered in 1976. She was laid down by Vosper Thornycroft in Singapore and launched on 15 March 1978. She was commissioned on 25 June 1979.

Description 
Seteria is a small missile boat, orientated to be a patrol boat. The overall length of this boat is 36.9 m, the width – 7.2 m and the draft – 1.8 m. The displacement tonnage is 150 or 206 tones (depending on the source). The ship is powered by two compression-ignition engines MTU 20V538 TB91 (9000 hp). Maximum quantity of the fuel she can take is 16 tones, consequently she can sail for 1,200 nautical miles at a speed of 14 knots.

She is armed with one twin mount for the Oerlikon 30-calibre GCM-B01 guns. The angle of this gun barrel is 85°, the weight of the projectile is 1 kg, the range is of 10 000 m and the rate of fire is 650 RPM. She is also equipped with two single M2 Browning and two launchers of anti-ship missiles MM38 Exocet.

History 
Seteria was commanded by First Admiral Dato Seri Pahlawan Haji Othman bin Hj Suhaili.

Exercise Pelican 1979 
Ex Pelican 1979, the first ever joint naval exercise between Royal Brunei Navy and Republic of Singapore Navy.

Exercise Pelican 1997 
A joint exercise hosted by Royal Brunei Navy and Republic of Singapore Navy from 2 to 9 October 1997. Seteria, KDB Serasa, KDB Perwira, KDB Pemburu, Waspada, RSS Vigilance, RSS Sea Tiger and  participated in the exercise.

CARAT 2004 
Seteria, Perwira, Pemburu, Waspada,  and  conducted a Cooperation Afloat Readiness and Training (CARAT) in the South China Sea on 24 June 2004.

Helang Laut 2008 
The Royal Brunei Navy and the Tentera National Indonesia Angkatan Laut (TNI AL) conducted a 5 days exercise from 15–19 December 2008 called "Helang Laut”. Seteria, Waspada, Pemburu and Serasa from Brunei and KRI Layang and KRI Singa from Indonesia participated in the exercise.

Gallery

References 

Royal Brunei Navy
1978 ships
Ships of Brunei